Kampar is a regency (kabupaten) of Riau, Indonesia. It has an area of 11,289.28 km2 and had a population of 686,204 at the 2010 Census, 793,005 at the 2015 Intermediate Census and 841,332 at the 2020 Census. The administrative centre of the regency is located at Bangkinang town.

Bordered by:

Geography 
 
The Kampar Regency covers an area of 11,289.28 km2, and is an area that lies between 1 ° 00'40 "north latitude to 0 ° 27'00" south latitude and 100 ° 28'30 "- 101 ° 14'30" east longitude. [ 6] The boundaries of Kampar Regency are as follows: North Rokan Hulu and Bengkalis Southern Regency Kuantan Singingi Fifty-City West District (West Sumatra Province) East Pekanbaru, Siak and Pelalawan. The Kampar Regency is traversed by two major rivers and several small rivers, including Sungai Kampar about 413.5 km long with an average depth of 7.7 m and an average width of 143 metres. All parts of the river are included in Kampar Regency, which includes the districts of XIII Koto Kampar, Bangkinang, Kuok (formerly Bangkinang West), Kampar, Siak Hulu, and Kampar Kiri. Then the Siak River upstream part of the length of about 90 km with an average depth of 8–12 m across Tapung District. Major rivers located in Kampar Regency are partly still functioning well as a means of transportation, clean water sources, fish farms, as well as a source of electrical energy (hydropower Koto Panjang). Kampar Regency has a generally tropical climate, the minimum temperature occurring in November and December amounting to 21 °C. The maximum temperature occurs in July with a temperature of 35 °C. The number of rainy days in 2009, the vast majority were around Bangkinang Seberang and Kampar Kiri.

Government 

Kampar was originally located in the province of Central Sumatra, established pursuant to Law No. 12 of 1956 with the capital Bangkinang. Then it was moved into Riau province, based on the Law on Emergency Number 19 Year 1957 and confirmed by Law No. 61 1958. Subsequently, for the development of the city of Pekanbaru, Kampar local government agreed to give up some of its territory for the purposes of expansion of the city of Pekanbaru, which was then confirmed by the Indonesian Government Regulation Number 19 of 1987.

In accordance with the Decree of the Governor of the Province of Riau Number: KPTS. 318VII1987 dated July 17, 1987, Kampar District consisted of 19 districts with two Vice Regent. The Vice Regent of Region I is based in Pasir Pangarayan and Vice Regent of Region II in Pangkalan Kerinci. Regent Assistant Region I coordinate the District of Rambah, Tandun, Rokan IV Koto, Kunto Darussalam, Fullness, and Tambusai. Regent Assistant coordinate the District of Region II Langgam, Pangkalan Kuras, Bunut and Kuala Kampar. While other districts are not included maid region regent I & II region directly under the district coordinator. Kampar Regency is currently led by partner Jeffery H. Noer Governor and Deputy Governor H. Ibrahim Ali SH, which is set by the plenary session the General Election Commission (KPU) Kampar for a term of 2011-2016. A 20th district as since been created.

Administrative Districts 

Kampar Regency is divided into twenty-one districts (kecamatan), as a result of the reorganisation of the previous twelve districts. The districts (with their administrative centres) are tabulated below with their areas and their 2010 and 2020 Census populations:

Notes: (a) 2010 population included in that for XIII Koto Kampar, from which it was split.(b) formerly named Bangkinang Barat. (c) formerly named Kampar Timur.

Demography 

The Census of Kampar Regency in 2010 recorded 688,204 persons, which consisted of 354,836 male and 333,368 female. The Census in 2020 recorded 841,332 persons, which consisted of 431,295 male and 410,037 female. Sex ratio (the ratio of the male population to the female population) thus was 105.2 in 2020. The Kampar population is Austronesian who often refer to themselves as Ughang Ocu, spread over most of Kampar region with Tribal Domo, Malay, Piliong / Piliang, Mandailiong, Putopang, Caniago, Kampai, Bendang, etc. In history, ethnicity, customs, and their culture is close to the Minangkabau society. Particularly with Limopuluah Luhak region. This happens because the new Kampar region apart from Minang since the Japanese colonial period in 1942. According to his H.Takahashi in Japan and Eastern Asia, 1953, the Military Government Kaigun Kampar in Sumatra enter into Shio Riau region as part of a strategy of territorial defense military on the East coast of Sumatra. Furthermore, there is also little ethnic Malays who generally live in the border areas bordering East with Siak and Pelalawan. Followed by ethnic Javanese majority have settled in Kampar since the colonial period and independence through transmigration programs scattered centers of transmigration settlements. Similarly Batak ethnic population found in large enough quantities to work as laborers in the plantation sector and other services. Besides the significant number of migrants of other tribes from West Sumatra Minangkabau who made their living as traders and businessmen. The most densely populated district that is Kampar District with 376 inhabitants / km2, followed by Tambang District with 266 inhabitants / km2, Rumbio Jaya District with 236 inhabitants / km2 and Kampar Utara District with 226 inhabitants / km2. The two relatively sparsely populated districts namely Kampar Kiri Hulu with a density of 8 inhabitants / km2 and Kampar Kiri Hilir with 17 inhabitants / km2.

Religion 

Kampar Regency has a resident Muslim majority, with minorities of Protestants, Catholics, Buddhists, and Hindus. Islam accounts for nearly 90% of total religious adherents throughout the regency. Subsequent Christian religions are the second larges, accounting for 8.6%. Moslems were the highest in Sub Siak Hulu as many as 63,511 people in 2010, although in general, all districts in Kampar have a Muslim majority. Jami Mosque of Air Tiris is one of the oldest mosques in Kampar Regency.

Economy 

Kampar Regency still has a lot of potential that can be exploited, especially in agriculture and aquaculture. Most of the population (67.22%) work in agriculture, plantation and forestry. Only a small fraction (12:22%) were working in the sector of Electricity, Gas and Water, as well as government. As one of the largest area in the province of Riau, Kampar ongoing basis to improve the facilities and infrastructure such as road network (1856.56 km), electricity (72.082 KWH) with 5 units of diesel power plant Hydroelectric Power Plant (HEPP) in Koto length that produces energy with a capacity of 114.240 KWH connected. Other facilities also include telecommunications services (fixed line, mobile phone and internet networks) and water network with a production capacity of 1,532,284 m³. Agriculture Agriculture such as palm oil and rubber, which is one plant that is suitable for land in Kampar regency. Plantation Special plantations for palm oil plantations currently Kampar district has a land area of 241.5 thousand hectares with potential for crude palm oil (CPO) as much as 966 thousand tons. Fishery In the field of aquaculture catfish developed through cages (fish pond in the form of rafts) along the Kampar river, seen the number of cages were lined up neatly along the river kampardan the cooperation between the Government of Kampar PT. Benecom with a total investment of Rp. 30 billion of which in the future will become a center Kampar catfish with a production of 220 tonnes per day.

Tourism and culture 

Kampar Regency has an estimated area of archaeological sites have been there during the Srivijaya namely Muara Takus, this region besides being a cultural heritage area is also a religious tourist destination for Buddhists. In addition Kampar Muslim community, still preserve the tradition Balimau Bakasai i.e. shower bath wash in Kampar River particularly welcome the month of Ramadan.

Then there is also the tradition that is the tradition Ma'awuo fish catch fish together (fishing ban) once a year, especially in the area of Lake Bokuok (District of Mine) and Subayang River in the village of Domo (Kampar Kiri Hulu). Kampar culture can not be separated from the influence of Minangkabau, which is identical with the title Limo Koto Kampar and formerly part of Pagaruyung. Limo Koto consists of Kuok, Salo, Bangkinang, Air Tiris and Rumbio. There are many tribal are still preserved to this day, including kinship models of maternal lines (matrilineal). The concept of custom and tradition together with the concept Minang tribe especially in Luhak Limopuluah.

Language and Music 
Colloquially Kampar society similar to the Minangkabau language, or the so-called language Ocu one variant which is similar to the language used in Luhak Limopuluah. The language is different accent variants Minangkabau language spoken by the people of Luhak Agam, Tanah Datar Luhak Minangkabau and other coastal areas. In addition, Limo Koto Kampar also has some sorts of traditional musical instruments called Calempong and Oguong.

Notable Kampar 
Kampar People

References 

Regencies of Riau